Peter Filkins is an American poet and literary translator. Filkins graduated from Williams College with a Bachelor of Arts and from Columbia University with a Master of Fine Arts degree. His poetry collections include the forthcoming Water / Music, as well as The View We’re Granted, co-winner of the 2013 Sheila Motton Best Book Award from the New England Poetry Club, and Augustine’s Vision, winner of the 2009 New American Press Chapbook Award. His poems, essays, reviews, and translations have appeared in numerous journals, including The New Republic, Partisan Review, The New Criterion, Poetry, The Yale Review, the New York Times Book Review, and the Los Angeles Times. He is a recipient of a 2005 Berlin Prize from the American Academy in Berlin, a 2015-2016 National Endowment for the Humanities Fellowship, a 2014 Leon Levy Center for Biography Fellowship, and a Fulbright Fellowship to Austria. In 2012 he was writer-in-residence at the James Merrill House, and he has held residencies at The MacDowell Colony, Yaddo, and the Millay Colony for the Arts.

Filkins has also translated several books of postwar German literature into English. His translation of Ingeborg Bachmann’s collected poems, Songs in Flight, received an Outstanding Translation Award in 1995 from the American Literary Translators Association and was reissued in an expanded second edition titled Darkness Spoken, which received a Distinguished Translation Award from the Austrian Ministry for Education, Art, and Culture in 2007. Filkins was the first to translate H. G. Adler's novels into English.  The Journey, Panorama, and The Wall, the three novels Filkins translated, were written soon after the war, but were not published until the 1962, 1968, and 1988, respectively. Filkins' translation of Panorama was listed as one of the best books of 2011 by The New Republic's editorial staff. and The Wall was named a Best Book of the Year for 2014 by Publishers Weekly. His biography, H.G. Adler: A Life in Many Worlds, was published by Oxford University Press in March 2019.

Filkins has taught literature and writing at Bard College at Simon's Rock since 1988 and translation at the main campus of Bard College since 2006.

Filkins was awarded a Guggenheim Fellowship in April 2022.

Bibliography
Poetry

Literary translations
 Trans. Peter Filkins
 Trans. Peter Filkins
 Trans. Peter Filkins
 Trans. Peter Filkins
 Trans. Peter Filkins
 Trans. Peter Filkins
 Trans. Peter Filkins
 Trans. Peter Filkins

Biography

Filkins, Peter (2019). H.G. Adler: A Life in Many Worlds. Oxford University Press. .

References

Living people
American male poets
American translators
Bard College at Simon's Rock faculty
Columbia University School of the Arts alumni
Williams College alumni
MacDowell Colony fellows
Year of birth missing (living people)